was a town located in Asakura District, Fukuoka Prefecture, Japan.

As of 2003, the town had an estimated population of 8,372 and a density of 186.13 persons per km². The total area was 44.98 km².

On March 20, 2006, Haki, along with the former town of Asakura (also from Asakura District), and the city of Amagi, was merged to create the city of Asakura.

External links
 Asakura official website 

Dissolved municipalities of Fukuoka Prefecture
Populated places disestablished in 2006
2006 disestablishments in Japan